Sommerville may refer to:

Institutions
Sommerville Manor School

People
Duncan MacLaren Young Sommerville, Scottish and New Zealand mathematician
George Sommerville, Scottish footballer
Ian Sommerville (academic), British academic
Ian Sommerville (technician), (fl. c. 1960s) 
James Sommerville, hornist for the Boston Symphony Orchestra
James Sommerville, English graphic designer

Places
Sommerville, alternative name for Somersville, California

See also
Somerville (disambiguation)
Summerville (disambiguation)